Aimo Stefano Diana (born 2 January 1978) is an Italian football manager, currently for Reggiana, and a former player. A player of wide range, he was capable of playing both as a wide midfielder or as a defender on the right flank.

Club career
Born in Brescia, Diana is a product of Brescia Calcio's youth system. He made his debuts for the first team in Serie B in 1997, and played his first Serie A game on 31 August of the same year, against Inter Milan. He played one season with Hellas Verona F.C. in a co-ownership deal, helping the side to a final ninth position in the top level, and left for Parma A.C. in 2001.

Diana was used irregularly by the Emilia-Romagna side, winning the Italian Cup in his first season, but hardly featuring at all in 2002–03. In January 2003 he moved on loan to Reggina Calcio along with Emiliano Bonazzoli, posteriorly signing for U.C. Sampdoria at the end of the campaign. A key member from the start for the Genovese, he helped the team qualify for the UEFA Cup in his second year, scoring five goals in 32 matches; in early May 2005 he scored the game's only at Juventus F.C. and, the following week, also found the net, in a 3–0 home success against ACF Fiorentina.

In the 2006 summer, Diana signed for U.S. Città di Palermo for €5 million, with Sampdoria also selling Marco Pisano to the same club for €4 million and receiving Massimo Bonanni (50% for €2million), Pietro Accardi (€2 million) and Christian Terlizzi (50% for €1.5 million). He was regularly used in one 1/2 seasons and scored two goals, including the equalizer in a 2–1 home win by the Rosanero against A.C. Milan on 26 September 2007. On 30 January of the following year he was sold to Torino F.C. in a permanent move, for €1.2 million.

In early January 2010, ultras of Torino attacked club players during David Di Michele's birthday party. After the incident, Riccardo Colombo, Diana, Di Michele, Massimo Loviso, Marco Pisano, Francesco Pratali and Paolo Zanetti were transferred to other clubs, with only Rolando Bianchi, Angelo Ogbonna and Matteo Rubin remaining.

Diana joined AC Bellinzona in Switzerland on loan in early February 2010, making his Super League debut on the 21st in a 1–2 away loss against FC Luzern, eventually contributing solidly (15 matches, 14 starts) as the club narrowly retained its division status.

Subsequently, 32-year-old Diana returned to Torino. On 4 January 2011 he mutually terminated his contract, re-signing for Bellinzona (on a permanent basis) the following day.

International career
After impressing for Sampdoria, Diana received his first call-ups to the Italian national team, making his debut in a friendly match with Spain on 28 April 2004.

A regular for the Azzurri under Marcello Lippi, an injury prevented him from being picked to the squad at the 2006 FIFA World Cup in Germany. On 2 June 2007, in his last appearance, Diana assisted on Filippo Inzaghi's second goal against the Faroe Islands, in a 2–1 away win for the UEFA Euro 2008 qualifying.

International goals
Scores and results list Italy's goal tally first.

Managerial career
After retiring, Diana took up a role as youth coach at FeralpiSalò, being successively promoted as head coach later in November 2015. He completed the season in eighth place in the 2015–16 Lega Pro, not being confirmed for the following year.

In August 2016, he was hired new head coach of Pavia, but resigned shortly thereafter, following the club's exclusion from Serie D due to financial issues. In February 2017, he was signed by Lega Pro club Melfi, failing to escape relegation by the end of the season.

He returned into management in December 2017 as the new boss of Sicilian Serie C club Sicula Leonzio.

On 20 November 2018, he was appointed head coach of Serie C club Renate, in relegation spot at the time. He guided Renate for three full seasons, the last of which ended with Renate topping the league for a long time until losing out to more renowned teams such as Como and Alessandria, and then losing to second-placed Girone B club Padova in the promotion playoffs. Following that, Diana agreed to leave Renate and accepted to join recently-relegated Serie C club Reggiana on a one-year deal, with an option of further extension in case of promotion to Serie B.

Managerial statistics

Honours
Parma
Coppa Italia: 2001–02

References

External links
 
 Aimo Diana at Federazione Italiana Giuoco Calcio (archived) 
 
 

1978 births
Living people
Footballers from Brescia
Italian footballers
Association football defenders
Association football midfielders
Serie A players
Serie B players
Serie C players
Brescia Calcio players
Hellas Verona F.C. players
Parma Calcio 1913 players
Reggina 1914 players
U.C. Sampdoria players
Palermo F.C. players
Torino F.C. players
F.C. Lumezzane V.G.Z. A.S.D. players
Swiss Super League players
AC Bellinzona players
Italy under-21 international footballers
Italy international footballers
Italian expatriate footballers
Expatriate footballers in Switzerland
Italian football managers
A.C. Reggiana 1919 managers
Serie C managers